The 2008 World Junior Figure Skating Championships were held from February 25 through March 2 in Sofia, Bulgaria. Commonly called "World Juniors" and "Junior Worlds", they are an annual figure skating competition in which elite figure skaters compete for the title of World Junior Champion. The event is open to figure skaters from ISU member nations who have reached the age of 13 by July 1 of the previous year, but have not yet turned 19. The upper age limit for men competing in pairs and dance is 21. Skaters compete in four disciplines: men's singles, ladies' singles, pair skating, and ice dancing.

The term "Junior" refers to the age level rather than necessarily the skill level. Therefore, some of the skaters competing have competed nationally and internationally at the senior level, but are still age-eligible for World Juniors. Regardless of whether they have competed as seniors, all competitors perform programs that conform to the ISU rules for junior level competition in terms of program lengths, jumping passes, etc.

Medals Table

Results

Men

Ladies

Pairs

Ice dancing

References

External links
 
 ISU site
 Starting Orders and Results
 Competitors list
  
 

World Junior Figure Skating Championships
World Junior
F
World Junior 2008